"Price on My Head" is a song by Canadian rapper Nav, featuring vocals from Canadian singer the Weeknd. The song was released through XO Records and Republic Records as the second single from Nav's second studio album, Bad Habits, on March 26, 2019. The song marks Nav and the Weeknd's second collaboration since Nav's single, "Some Way" from his self-titled mixtape (2017). The song was produced by Derek Wise from Canadian hip hop duo 88Glam and AlexOnWeed.

Lyrics
The song features lyrics about being envied for one's "fame and wealth".

Music video
A music video for the track directed by Kid. Studio was released on March 26, 2019. It is set in Toronto, the hometown of both Nav and the Weeknd, and was described as "apocalyptic" and "intense".

Charts

Certifications

References

External links
 
 

2019 singles
2019 songs
Nav (rapper) songs
The Weeknd songs
Songs written by Nav (rapper)
Songs written by the Weeknd
Songs written by Belly (rapper)